Sunil Thapa is a leading Nepalese actor who has appeared in Nepali, Bollywood and Bhojpuri films. He started his career with the Bollywood movie Ek Duuje Ke Liye.

He is an enigmatic figure in the Nepali movie industry, winning more number of awards, including the Motion Pictures Award Nepal twice. He is popular for his villainous roles in Nepali movies.

Career
Thapa started his modelling career in 1974 in Mumbai (then Bombay), with Binny's and Mafatlal Fabrics.

During his early days, he was also engaged in sports and was a professional football player for ICL Club Bombay and Orkay's Sports Club.

Besides acting and sports, he also worked as a photo journalist for JS Magazine (Junior Statesman) and covered the Bhutan Coronation in 1974. In 2014 he was also nominated for Best Actor in a Supporting Role in Filmfare Award for his extraordinary role in Mary Kom. He is recently working for Nepali Movie "Sher Bahadur".

Filmography
Thapa has featured in many Nepalese, Bhojpuri and Hindi films. The following are some of the select films of Thapa.

References

External links

 
 

Living people
1957 births
20th-century Nepalese male actors
21st-century Nepalese male actors
Male actors in Hindi cinema
Actors from Kathmandu
Nepalese male film actors